Tallahassee SC is an American soccer club based in Tallahassee, Florida that competes in the National Premier Soccer League. It formerly played in the Gulf Coast Premier League.

History 

Tallahassee SC was founded on May 3, 2018, by residents of Tallahassee, FL, Leon County, FL including Chris Petley, Mike Bonfanti and 4 others looking to bring a semi-professional soccer team to Tallahassee. 

In February 2019, Josh Bruno was named as the first head coach of the team. The club played its first ever match against the Savannah Clovers on May 4, 2019, in front of over 600 fans at the FSU Intramural Fields. 

Tallahassee Soccer Club GK Hugo Peruzzi was named GCPL Eastern Conference MVP and coach Josh Bruno selected Coach of the Year after TLHSC won the conference in its inaugural season. Additionally, Tallahassee SC had the most players selected to the East's Best XI team. Joining Peruzzi was forward Boneco Bazil and midfielders Johnny Fitzgerald and Aron Wimberly. 

Hugo Peruzzi, along with Lev Ari from Mobile F.C., were the only players from the Eastern Conference picked up for the ALL-CONFERENCE BEST XI GCPL 2019. 

On November 12, 2019, it was announced that Tallahassee SC would join the National Premier Soccer League in a newly formed Gulf Coast Conference that featured Tallahassee, Port City FC, AFC Mobile, Pensacola FC, and NPSL mainstays the New Orleans Jesters and Jacksonville Armada.

Roster

Head coaches
 Josh Bruno (2019-2022)
 Joel Di Castri (Current)

Stadium
 Gene Cox Stadium; Tallahassee, Florida (2021-Current)
 Florida State University Main Sports Complex; Tallahassee, Florida (2019–2020)

References

External links
 

National Premier Soccer League teams
Sports in Tallahassee, Florida
2018 establishments in Florida
Association football clubs established in 2018